Xerocrassa prietoi is a species of air-breathing land snail, a pulmonate gastropod mollusk in the family Geomitridae. 

Subspecies
 Xerocrassa prietoi muroensis Graack, 2005
 Xerocrassa prietoi prietoi (Hidalgo, 1878)

Distribution

This species is endemic to the Balearic island of Mallorca in Spain.

References

External links
 Hidalgo, J. G. (1878). Catalogue des mollusques terrestres des îles Baléares. Journal de Conchyliologie. 26: 213-247, pl. 9. Paris

prietoi
Molluscs of Europe
Endemic fauna of the Balearic Islands
Gastropods described in 1878